The First Dominican Republic of the Dominican Republic began on 27 February 1844 with the proclamation of the Dominican Republic, and culminated on 18 March 1861 with the annexation of the country to Spain. During these 17 years the nation was economically and politically unstable due to prior war against Haiti and internal conflicts. There were 8 governments (3 of which corresponded to Pedro Santana and 2 to Buenaventura Báez).

Presidents

See also
 History of the Dominican Republic
 Second Dominican Republic
 Third Dominican Republic

References

History of Hispaniola
History of the Dominican Republic
1844 in the Dominican Republic
Government of the Dominican Republic